Rodrigo Tapia may refer to:

 Rodrigo Tapia (footballer, born 1988), Chilean footballer
 Rodrigo Tapia (footballer, born 1994), Argentine footballer